Bournemouth Gardens are Grade II listed gardens in the town of Bournemouth, Dorset, England. Created in the nineteenth century, the gardens follow the towns eponymous River Bourne three kilometres from the historic boundary with Poole south-eastwards into Bournemouth Town Centre.

The Gardens are home to a number of significant Bournemouth landmarks and listed buildings such as; the Town Hall, the War Memorial, St. Andrew's Church and the Pavilion Theatre.

Bournemouth Gardens have been Green Flag Award winners since 1999.

History 
The gardens were planted between 1836 and 1840, with designs made by architects Benjamin Ferrey and Decimus Burton. It wasn't until 1859 that the gardens became publicly accessible.

On 1 May 1908, 7 people were killed and 26 were injured when a tram crashed into the gardens. In 1924-29 the Pavilion Theatre was built in the Lower Central Gardens. In 1970 the Wessex Way flyover (A338) was constructed, cutting through the Upper Central Gardens Collectively known as Upper, Central and Lower Pleasure Gardens, and Coy Pond Gardens, Bournemouth Gardens has constituted as a listed building since 1986 by Historic England.

The COVID-19 pandemic in 2020 reportedly hit the finances of the Gardens Trust.

Coy Pond Gardens 
The gardens begin at Coy Pond. The gardens are bordered by Bourne Valley and Talbot Woods to the north and Branksome Woods and Westbourne to the south.

Upper Gardens 

The Upper Gardens has three distinct continental gardens, European, Asian and North American. The Upper Gardens hold many unusual tree species including a North American Giant Redwood (believed to be the largest in Britain).

The water tower was built between 1883 and 1903, and is currently disused.

Central Gardens 

The Square separates Central Gardens from the Lower Gardens. Bournemouth War Memorial was built in 1922.

Lower Gardens 
The historic band stand is in the Lower Gardens.The rock garden was built in the 1930s.

Events 
The Gardens have an annual Winter Wonderland attraction at Christmas time.

Amenities 
Bournemouth Gardens has a Tennis Centre. The Bournemouth Eye hot air balloon was an attraction until 2016.

Gallery

References 

Grade II listed garden and park buildings
Gardens in Dorset
Tourist attractions in Bournemouth
English gardens in English Landscape Garden style
1830s establishments in England
Grade II listed parks and gardens in Dorset